Brigadier-General Sir Edward Raban, KCB, KBE (8 August 1850 – 8 February 1927) was a British Army officer in the Royal Engineers.

References 

 https://www.nytimes.com/1927/02/10/archives/sir-edward-raban-dies-exlnstructor-at-royal-military-college-in.html
 https://www.ukwhoswho.com/view/10.1093/ww/9780199540891.001.0001/ww-9780199540884-e-201922

1850 births
1927 deaths
British Army generals of World War I
Royal Engineers officers
Knights Commander of the Order of the Bath
Knights Commander of the Order of the British Empire
People educated at Sherborne School
Graduates of the Royal Military Academy, Woolwich